Bloomer is a surname. It may refer to:

Amelia Bloomer (1818–1894), American political activist
Ariel Bloomer (born 1989), American singer
Asa S. Bloomer (1891–1963), American politician
Boaz Bloomer (1801–1874), British businessman
Daphne Bloomer (born 1973), American actress
Harold Bloomer (1902–1965), American fencer
James Bloomer (1880–1963), American football player 
John H. Bloomer (1930–1995), American politician
Kent Bloomer (born 1935), American sculptor
Matthew Bloomer (born 1978), British football player
Millard Bloomer (1899–1974), American fencer
Raymond Bloomer (1897–1982), American actor
Robert A. Bloomer (1921–1999), American politician
Steve Bloomer (1874–1938), British football player
Steve Bloomer (1909–1943), Australian Rules football player
Thomas Bloomer (1894–1984), Irish bishop

See also
Bloomer (disambiguation)
Blumer

English-language surnames